Ab Sarduiyeh (also Romanized as Āb Sardū’īyeh; also known as Ābsardīyeh and Tump-i-Ābsardi) is a village in Rudbar Rural District, in the Central District of Rudbar-e Jonubi County, Kerman Province, Iran. At the 2006 census, its population was 992, in 197 families.

References 

Populated places in Rudbar-e Jonubi County